Todd Thicke is a Canadian television writer and producer most known for his work as the executive producer and head writer of America's Funniest Home Videos since the show's premiere in 1989.

Biography
Before moving to Los Angeles from Toronto in 1982, Thicke studied English literature at the University of Western Ontario in London and at York University in Toronto. He currently resides in Los Angeles with his wife and two children. He is the younger brother of television actor Alan Thicke, and uncle to singer/songwriter Robin Thicke and actors Brennan Thicke and Carter Thicke.

Television career 
Over the course of AFV’s 26-year-long run, Thicke has served in many positions; most notably as the head writer and executive producer, as well as writer, co-producer, and co-executive producer. He is credited with having written the pilot script, and has worked with many stars over the years including but not limited to: Bob Saget, Tom Bergeron, Anthony Anderson, Tracee Ellis Ross, Cristela Alonso, David Foster, Alan Thicke, Billy Ray Cyrus, Howie Mandel, Jerry Seinfeld, Frank Zappa, Jim Carrey, Muhammad Ali, and Anne Murray. 

Thicke has written and produced programming for ABC, Disney, CBC, CTV, FOX, Hallmark, and Lifetime.

Throughout his career, Thicke has written and produced many programs including The Wil Shriner Show, Animal Crack-Ups, Rick Dees Into the Night, Growing Pains, Candid Camera, John Callahan’s Quads, Pelswick, and 65 episodes for the popular children's cartoon Dennis the Menace. In addition to writing, he also served as the story editor for 26 episodes of John Callahan’s Quads.

Thicke has also produced many comedy/reality shows in the U.S. and Canada, including The NHL Awards, Anne Murray Christmas, The Alan Thicke Show, The World Magic Awards, The I Do Diaries, and National Lampoon’s Quest for Comedy.

He is also credited with writing numerous television theme songs, including the music packages for the 1986-1987 revival of Split Second and the 1984–1986 run of Let's Make a Deal.

Thicke founded his production company Team Thicke in late 2015. Since then, he has been successfully developing programming for networks and studios on both sides of the Canadian/American border. In 2017, Team Thicke entered into deals with Bell Media and Wilshire Studios.

Awards and nominations

Nominations 
 Daytime Emmy for Special Classification of Outstanding Individual Achievement – Writers for The Wil Shriner Show
 Gemini Award for Best Writing in a Comedy or Variety Program or Series for The NHL Awards

Further recognition 
Thicke has been interviewed by many widely known media sources such as Entertainment Weekly (2006), Variety (2007), Entertainment Tonight (2008), and the Toronto Sun (2017). He has also been featured in articles written for ADWEEK, Time Magazine and thestar.com.

In addition to his television career, Thicke has also served two terms on the Steering Committee for the Caucus of Producers, Writers and Directors, and has spoken at numerous industry panels, including The Paley Center, The TV Academy, and NATPE.

In 2009, Thicke's original pilot script for America's Funniest Home Videos was added to the Smithsonian’s National Museum of American History collection. It is now permanently displayed in Washington.

In May 2016, Thicke was a guest lecturer at U.C. Davis, where he and several other panelists gave a talk on comedy to Davis theatre students.

Most recently, in July 2016, Thicke was featured in an article and accompanying video about Tom Bergeron on CinemaBlend.com.

References

Sources
How Tom Bergeron Felt About The America's Funniest Home Videos Jokes He Told - Cinema Blend
Video database stores flops, kick – Variety
EW goes inside "America's Funniest Home Videos" – Entertainment Weekly
Todd Thicke – Entertainment Tonight
Todd Thicke at the Smithsonian
Smithsonian Thicke with history – thestar.com
So What Do You Do, Todd Thicke, EP of America's Funniest Home Videos? – ADWEEK
Hey Baby, Can I Get You a Beer? – Time Magazine
Alan Thicke's final performance - Toronto Sun 
Loving brother fondly remembers Alan Thicke - Toronto Sun

External links

Todd Thicke at www.TeamThicke.com

Year of birth missing (living people)
Living people
Canadian television producers
Canadian male screenwriters
20th-century Canadian screenwriters
20th-century Canadian male writers